Good Men, Good Women is a 1995 Taiwanese film directed by Hou Hsiao-hsien, starring Annie Yi, Lim Giong, and Jack Kao. It is the last installment in the trilogy that began with A City of Sadness (1989) and continued with The Puppetmaster (1993). Like its predecessors, it deals with the complicated issues of Taiwanese history and national identity.

Plot 
The film depicts the real-life story of Chiang Bi-yu (Annie Yi). In the 1940s, she and her newlywed husband, Chung Hao-tung (Lim Giong), head to mainland China to join the anti-Japanese resistance.  During the war, she is forced to give her baby up for adoption. After the war they return to Taiwan, as Chung is to distribute a communist paper called The Enlightenment. However, as the Korean War deepens, Chiang Kai-shek's Kuomintang government intensifies the White Terror and Chung is executed.

The film consists of three intermingling storylines and scattered throughout the film are interludes of an actress (also played by Yi) who prepares for the role of Chiang Bi-yu, and also confronts her deceased boyfriend's past.

Cast
 Annie Yi - Liang Ching / 
 Lim Giong - 
 Jack Kao - Ah Wel
 Hsi Hsiang - Ah Hsi
  - Hsiao Dao-ying
 Lu Li-chin - Mrs. Hslao
 Tsai Chen-nan - Ah Nan
 Vicky Wei - Liang Ching's Sister

Awards 
Good Men, Good Women won the Golden Horse Award for best director (1995), and was shown in the Cannes Film Festival.

References

Silbergeld, Jerome (2004). Hitchcock With a Chinese Face: Cinematic Doubles, Oedipal Triangles, and China's Moral Voice. Seattle and London: University of Washington Press.

External links 
 
 

1995 films
1995 drama films
Taiwanese war drama films
1990s Mandarin-language films
Films directed by Hou Hsiao-hsien
Japanese war drama films
Films with screenplays by Chu T’ien-wen
Taiwanese romantic drama films
Japanese romantic drama films